Puerto Nare Airport  is an airport serving the river town of Puerto Nare in the Antioquia Department of Colombia.

Runway length does not include a  paved overrun on the east end.

See also

Transport in Colombia
List of airports in Colombia

References

External links
OpenStreetMap - Puerto Nare
OurAirports - Puerto Nare
SkyVector - Puerto Nare
Puerto Nare Airport

Airports in Colombia